Anthracothecium is a genus of lichen-forming fungi in the family Pyrenulaceae.

Species
 Anthracothecium amphitropum 
 Anthracothecium aurantiacum 
 Anthracothecium australiense 
 Anthracothecium capense 
 Anthracothecium cristatellum 
 Anthracothecium doleschallii 
 Anthracothecium erigens 
 Anthracothecium himalayense 
 Anthracothecium interlatens 
 Anthracothecium macrosporum 
 Anthracothecium oculatum 
 Anthracothecium prasinum 
 Anthracothecium sinapispermum 
 Anthracothecium subvariolosum 
 Anthracothecium thwaitesii 
 Anthracothecium variolosum

References

Pyrenulales
Lichen genera
Eurotiomycetes genera
Taxa described in 1860